Tourist season may refer to:

 For tourism destinations, the months of peak demand or the months in which seasonal attractions are open
 Tourist Season (novel), a 1986 novel by Carl Hiaasen

See also
 Tourist (disambiguation)
 Terrorist (disambiguation)